In military terms, 82nd Division or 82nd Infantry Division (United States) may refer to:

 Infantry divisions 
 82nd Reserve Division (German Empire)
 82nd (West Africa) Division (United Kingdom)
 82nd Guards Rifle Division (Soviet Union)
 82nd Rifle Division (later 82nd Motorized Division, Soviet Union)

 Airborne divisions 
 82nd Airborne Division (United States)

See also
 82nd Regiment (disambiguation)
 82nd Squadron (disambiguation)